The following lists events that happened in 2010 in Finland.

Incumbents
President – Tarja Halonen
Prime Minister – Matti Vanhanen, Mari Kiviniemi
Speaker – Sauli Niinistö

Events
12-28 February – 95 athletes competed for Finland at the 2010 Winter Olympics
21 November to 2 December – the 10th International Jean Sibelius Violin Competition took place in Helsinki

Deaths

8 January – Tony Halme, politician and martial artist (b. 1963)
8 January – Rolf Koskinen, orienteering competitor (b. 1939)
27 February – Helge Herala, stage and film actor (b. 1922)
30 April – Jorma Peltonen, ice hockey player (b. 1944)
5 May – Harry Siljander, light-heavyweight boxer (b. 1922).
31 May – Olli Laiho, gymnast (b. 1943).
13 July – Pentti Linnosvuo, sport shooter (b. 1933).
16 September – Erkki Ertama, composer and conductor (b. 1927)
3 November – Pentti Uotinen, ski jumper (b. 1931)
9 December – Thorvald Strömberg, sprint canoer (b. 1931).

References

 
2010s in Finland
Finland
Finland
Years of the 21st century in Finland